The Rams–Vikings rivalry is an NFL rivalry between the Los Angeles Rams and Minnesota Vikings.

The rivalry was most heated in the 1970s when the Vikings and Rams faced off in many consequential playoff games. To-date, the Vikings are the Rams second most played playoff opponent with seven games and the Rams are tied with the Cowboys as the most played playoff opponent for the Vikings.

The Vikings lead the all-time series 27–18–1 and are 5–2 in the playoffs.

Notable moments and games
 The 1972 game was the highest-scoring game of the year for both of those teams, as Fran Tarkenton of the Vikings threw for 319 yards and four touchdowns. For his part, Roman Gabriel of the Rams would complete 25 passes in the game, which at that time was his second-highest career total ever in that category.
 Playing inside a mud-soaked Los Angeles Coliseum in the divisional round of the '77 playoffs, the Vikings jumped out to a 14–0 lead before holding on for a 14–7 victory. Despite the mud, both teams found considerable traction in their running games. Rams running back Lawrence McCutcheon and Vikings running back Chuck Foreman each rushing for over 100 yards.
In 1985, it was a defensive battle, as all of the first half scoring came on two Rams field goals to give them a 6–0 lead. Eric Dickerson then scored a touchdown in the third quarter to make it 13–0. The Vikings mounted a bit of a comeback, scoring on a Ted Brown touchdown run and a Jan Stenerud field goal, but it wasn't quite enough as the Rams held on to win 13–10.
In 2015, the Vikings defeated the Rams 21–18 in overtime following an illegal hit to Minnesota quarterback Teddy Bridgewater by Rams' cornerback Lamarcus Joyner. Mike Zimmer famously declined receiving the ball in overtime after winning the toss due to favorable wind conditions for a possible game-winning kick. The Vikings ended up stopping the Rams, getting the ball, and kicking a game winning field goal.

Connections between the two teams
Shortly after the Rams won Super Bowl LVI, the Vikings hired their offensive coordinator, Kevin O'Connell, to serve as their new head coach following the firing of Zimmer at season's end. O'Connell brought several assistants from the Rams to work with him in Minnesota, with the most notable one being current Vikings offensive coordinator and former Rams tight end coach Wes Phillips.

Game results 

|-
| 
| 
| style="| Rams  31–17 
| style="| Vikings  42–21
| Tie  1–1
| Vikings join NFL as an expansion team and are placed in the Western Conference.
|-
| 
| style="| 
| style="| Vikings  38–14 
| Tie  24–24
| Vikings  2–1–1
| 
|-
| 
| 
| style="| Rams  27–24
| style="| Vikings  21–13
| Vikings  3–2–1
|
|-
| 
| 
| style="| Rams  22–13
| style="| Vikings  34–13
| Vikings  4–3–1 
| 
|-
| 
| style="| 
| style="| Vikings  38–35
| style="| Vikings  24–13
| Vikings  6–3–1 
| 
|-
| 
| 
| style="| Rams  21–6
| style="| Vikings  35–7
| Vikings  7–4–1 
| 
|-
| 
| style=" | 
| style="| Rams  39–3 
| 
| Vikings  7–5–1  
| Vikings are moved to the Central Division. 
|-
| 
| style="| 
|  
| style="| Rams  31–3
| Vikings  7–6–1
| 
|-
| 
| style="| 
| style="| Vikings  20–13
| 
| Vikings  8–6–1 
| 
|-
! 1969 Playoffs
! style="| 
! 
! style="| Vikings  23–20
! Vikings  9–6–1 
| NFL Western Conference Championship Game
|-

|-
| 
| style="| Vikings  13–3
| Metropolitan Stadium
| Vikings  10–6–1 
| 
|-
| 
| style="| Vikings  45–41
| Los Angeles Memorial Coliseum
| Vikings  11–6–1
| 
|-
| 
| style="| Vikings  10–9
| Metropolitan Stadium
| Vikings  12–6–1
| Vikings lose Super Bowl VIII
|-
| 
| style="| Rams  20–17
| Los Angeles Memorial Coliseum
| Vikings  12–7–1
| 
|-
! 1974 Playoffs
! style="| Vikings  14–10
! Metropolitan Stadium
! Vikings  13–7–1
! NFC Championship Game. Vikings lose Super Bowl IX.
|-
| 
| Tie  10–10
| Metropolitan Stadium
| Vikings  13–7–2
| 
|-
! 1976 Playoffs
! style="| Vikings  24–13
! Metropolitan Stadium
! Vikings  14–7–2
! NFC Championship Game. Vikings lose Super Bowl XI.
|-
| 
| style="| Rams  35–3
| Los Angeles Memorial Coliseum
| Vikings  14–8–2
| 
|-
! 1977 Playoffs
! style="| Vikings  14–7
! Los Angeles Memorial Coliseum
! Vikings  15–8–2
! NFC Divisional Round
|-
| 
| style="| Rams  34–17
| Metropolitan Stadium
| Vikings  15–9–2
| Final meeting at Metropolitan Stadium.
|-
! 1978 Playoffs
! style="| Rams  34–10
! Los Angeles Memorial Coliseum
! Vikings  15–10–2
! NFC Divisional Round
|-
| 
| style="| Rams  27–21(OT)
| Los Angeles Memorial Coliseum
| Vikings  15–11–2
| Final meeting at the Los Angeles Memorial Coliseum until 2018. Rams lose Super Bowl XIV.
|-

|-
| 
| style="| Rams  13–10
| Anaheim Stadium
| Vikings  15–12–2
| First meeting at Anaheim Stadium.
|-
| 
| style="| Vikings  21–16
| Anaheim Stadium
| Vikings  16–12–2
|-
! 1988 Playoffs
! style="| Vikings  28–17
! Metrodome
! Vikings  17–12–2
! NFC Wild Card Game. First meeting at the Metrodome.
|-
|  
| style="| Vikings  23–21
| Metrodome
| Vikings  18–12–2
| 
|-

|-
| 
| style="| Vikings  20–14
| Metrodome
| Vikings  19–12–2
| 
|-
| 
| style="| Vikings  31–17
| Anaheim Stadium
| Vikings  20–12–2
| Final meeting at Anaheim Stadium.
|-
| 
| style="| Vikings  38–31
| Trans World Dome
| Vikings  21–12–2 
| First meeting at Trans World Dome and in St. Louis.
|-
! 1999 Playoffs
! style="| Rams  49–37
! Trans World Dome
! Vikings  21–13–2
! NFC Divisional Round. Rams win Super Bowl XXXIV. 

|-
| 
| style="| Rams  40–29
| Trans World Dome
| Vikings  21–14–2 
|
|-
| 
| style="| Rams  48–17
| Edward Jones Dome
| Vikings  21–15–2 
|
|-
| 
| style="| Vikings  27–13
| Metrodome
| Vikings  22–15–2
| 
|-
| 
| style="| Rams  41–21
| Metrodome
| Vikings  22–16–2 
| Final meeting at the Metrodome.
|-
| 
| style="| Vikings  38–10
| Edward Jones Dome
| Vikings  23–16–2
|

|-
| 
| style="| Vikings  36–22
| Edward Jones Dome
| Vikings  24–16–2 
| 
|-
| 
| style="| Vikings  34–6
| Edward Jones Dome
| Vikings  25–16–2
| Final meeting at Edward Jones Dome. 
|-
| 
| style="| Vikings  21–18(OT)
| TCF Bank Stadium
| Vikings  26–16–2 
| First meeting at TCF Bank Stadium. Final meeting between the Vikings and St. Louis Rams as the Rams relocated to Los Angeles following the season.
|-
| 
| style="| Vikings  24–7
| U.S. Bank Stadium
| Vikings  27–16–2 
| First meeting at US Bank Stadium, and the first meeting since 1992 between the Vikings and Los Angeles Rams.
|-
| 
| style="| Rams  38–31
| Los Angeles Memorial Coliseum
| Vikings  27–17–2 
| Rams use the L.A. Coliseum as a temporary home while SoFi Stadium is under construction. 
|-

|-
| 
| style="| Rams  30–23
| U.S. Bank Stadium
| Vikings  27–18–2
| Rams win Super Bowl LVI. Following season's end, the Vikings hired Rams offensive coordinator Kevin O'Connell to serve as their next head coach.
|-

|-
| Regular season
| style="|
| Rams 12–10
| Vikings 12–4–2
| 
|-
| Postseason
| style="|
| Rams 2–1
| Vikings 4–0
| 
|-
| Regular and postseason
| style="|
| Rams 14–11
| Vikings 16–4–2
|
|-

References

National Football League rivalries
Rams
Vikings